La fille de l'air is a 1992 French film directed by Maroun Bagdadi.

Cast 
 Béatrice Dalle as Brigitte
 Hippolyte Girardot as Philippe
 Jean-Claude Dreyfus as Marcel
 Catherine Jacob as Rose
 Thierry Fortineau as Daniel
 Roland Bertin as Maître Lefort
 Jean-Paul Roussillon as Raymond
 Isabelle Candelier as Jacqueline
 Liliane Rovère as The Mother

References

External links 
 

1992 films
French crime thriller films
1990s French-language films
Films scored by Gabriel Yared
1990s French films